Margareta Arvidsson (born 12 October 1947) is a Swedish actress, fashion model and beauty queen who was crowned as the 1966 Miss Universe at age 18. She represented Vänersborg in the 1966 Miss Sweden Pageant. She was the second Swedish to win the crown, 11 years after Hillevi Rombin.

Arvidsson won the Miss Photogenic title at the 15th Annual Miss Universe Pageant which was held in Miami Beach, Florida, culminating with her crowning on 16 July 1966. After her crowning, she walked to greet the audience, interviewed the pageant host, and posed for pictures with her runners-up, sitting on the throne.

In March 1999, Margareta Arvidsson was a guest of honor at the 50th Anniversary of the Miss Sweden Pageant.

References

External links
 
 

1947 births
Living people
Miss Universe 1966 contestants
Miss Universe winners
Swedish beauty pageant winners